Acacia translucens, commonly known as poverty bush, is a shrub that is endemic to a large area of north western Australia.

Description
As with many arid shrubland Acacia species, it has phyllodes instead of leaves. It blooms between March and November. The seed pods are held erect above the foliage, instead of hanging down like most Acacias.

Taxonomy
The species was first formally described by the botanist Allan Cunninhgham in 1837 as a part of the William Jackson Hooker work Icones Plantarum. It was reclassified as Racosperma transluscens in 1987 by Leslie Pedley then transferred back to genus Acacia in 2006.

Distribution
It is native to arid areas of spinifex plains in northern Australia.  It is distributed throughout the inland Pilbara and Kimberley regions of Western Australia, and east into the Victoria River region of the Northern Territory usually growing in shallow sandy soils of sandstone. It is often situated in gully floors and on hillsides as a part of open Eucalyptus woodland communities.

Cultivation
The plant is used in gardens and is a hardy grower in tropical regions and needs a sunny position and well-drained soil. The seeds need to be treated with boiling water or scarified for propagation.

See also
List of Acacia species

References

 .

translucens
Fabales of Australia
Acacias of Western Australia
Flora of the Northern Territory
Plants described in 1837
Taxa named by Allan Cunningham (botanist)